USS M. J. Scanlon (ID-3513) was a United States Navy cargo ship in commission from 1918 to 1919.

Construction, acquisition, and commissioning
M. J. Scanlon was built in 1918 as the commercial cargo ship SS M. J. Scanlon by the New York Shipbuilding Company at Camden, New Jersey, for the United States Shipping Board. She was completed in September 1918 and on 23 September 1918 the U.S. Navy acquired her from the Shipping Board for use during World War I. Assigned the naval registry identification number 3513, she was commissioned the same day as USS M. J. Scanlon (ID-3513) at Philadelphia, Pennsylvania.

Operational history
On 26 September 1918, M. J. Scanlon steamed to Norfolk, Virginia, where she loaded a cargo of United States Army supplies. In mid-October 1918, she departed Norfolk and steamed to New York City to join a convoy to Europe. Departing New York on 1 November 1918, she reached St. Nazaire, France, on 18 November 1918, a week after the 11 November 1918 Armistice with Germany that ended World War I.  She discharged her cargo at St. Nazaire, then took on ballast and coal at Brest, France, early in December 1918.

On 3 December 1918, M. J. Scanlon departed Brest for the United States, arriving at New York City on 20 December 1918. She returned to Philadelphia on 7 January 1919.

Decommissioning and later career
M. J. Scanlon was decommissioned at Philadelphia on 27 January 1919, and the Navy transferred her back to the U.S. Shipping Board. In subsequent commercial service, she operated as SS M. J. Scanlon until 1925 or 1926, when she was sold to the Hammond Lumber Company and renamed SS Missoula. She was renamed SS Malamton in 1935, and SS Minotaur in 1941.

On 9 January 1943, during World War II, Minotaur was torpedoed and sunk off Surinam by the German submarine U-124 with the loss of six lives.

Notes

References

Department of the Navy: Naval Historical Center Online Library of Selected Images: U.S. Navy Ships: USS M. J. Scanlon (ID # 3513), 1918-1919. Originally, and later, S.S. M. J. Scanlon (American Freighter, 1918) Later S.S. Missoula, S.S. Malamton, and S.S. Minotaur. 
NavSource Online: Section Patrol Craft Photo Archive: M. J. Scanlon (ID 3513)

 

Auxiliary ships of the United States Navy
World War I cargo ships of the United States
Ships built by New York Shipbuilding Corporation
1918 ships
Ships sunk by German submarines in World War II
World War II shipwrecks in the Atlantic Ocean